CJVN-FM is a low-powered French-language radio station, which broadcasts a Christian radio format on the frequency of 92.7 MHz (FM) in Ottawa, Ontario, Canada. The station is owned by Fiston Kalambay on behalf of a not for-profit corporation to be incorporated, and received approval from the CRTC on July 22, 2014. The station is licensed to broadcast with an effective radiated power of 50 watts (non-directional antenna with an effective height of antenna above average terrain of 41 metres). The signal began testing on April 17, 2015.

References

External links
fmradiovienouvelle.com - Radio Vie Nouvelle – La radio chrétienne francophone
 

JVN
JVN
JVN